Hélia Rogério de Souza (born 10 March 1970 in São Paulo), nicknamed Fofão, is a retired Brazilian female volleyball player who competed for her country's national team in five consecutive Summer Olympics, starting in 1992. She won a gold medal in 2008 and twice won a bronze medal, in 1996 and 2000.  She also claimed the gold medal at the 1999 Pan American Games.

She is nicknamed Fofão because of her large cheeks similar to a famous character of a 1980s children's TV program in Brazil named "Fofão".

Career
She participated at the 1999 FIVB Volleyball Women's World Cup. She won the 2006–07 CEV Cup with the Italian club Sirio Perugia and was awarded Best Setter. The next season with Grupo 2002 Murcia she was awarded "Best Setter" at the 2007–08 CEV Indesit Champions League.

Souza retired from the Brazil national team on 7 September 2008, after helping her country beat Dominican Republic 3-0 and won the Final Four competition. From 1991, when she played her first game for Brazil, to 2008, she played 340 games for the national team.

She signed with the Turkish club Fenerbahçe Acıbadem since 4 July 2010.

Hélia won the bronze medal at the 2010–11 CEV Champions League with Fenerbahçe Acıbadem.

Fofão won the silver medal at the 2013 Club World Championship playing with Unilever Vôlei.

During the 2015 FIVB Club World Championship, Sousa played with the Brazilian club Rexona Ades Rio and her team lost the bronze medal match to the Swiss Voléro Zürich, At age 45, this was Fofao last match, as she announced her retirement.


Clubs
  Pão de Açúcar E.C. (1985–1987)
  Pão de Açúcar/Paineiras E.C. (1988–1990)
  Colgate-Pão de Açúcar/São Caetano E.C. (1990–1992)
  Colgate/São Caetano E.C. (1992–1994)
  Sollo/Tietê E.C. (1994–1995)
  Transmontano/J.C. Amaral (1995–1996)
  UNIBAN/São Caetano E.C. (1996–1998)
  UNIBAN/São Bernardo (1998–1999)
  MRV/Minas (1999–2003)
  Rexona-Ades (2003–2004)
  Sirio Perugia (2004–2007)
  Grupo 2002 Murcia (2007–2008)
  São Caetano/Blausiegel (2008–2010)
  Fenerbahçe Acıbadem Istanbul (2010–2011)
  Unilever Vôlei (2012-2014)
  Rexona Ades Rio (2014–2015)

Awards

Individuals

 1998 FIVB World Grand Prix "Best Setter"
 1999 FIVB World Grand Prix "Best Setter"
 1999 Pan-American Games "Best Setter"
 1999 Pan-American Games "Most Valuable Player"
 2000 FIVB World Grand Prix "Best Setter"
 2000 Summer Olympics "Best Setter"
 2006–07 CEV Cup "Best Setter"
 2007–08 CEV Champions League "Best Setter"
 2007 FIVB World Cup "Best Setter"
 2007 Pan-American Games "Best Setter"
 2008 Final Four Cup "Most Valuable Player"
 2008 Final Four Cup "Best Setter"
 2008 Summer Olympics "Best Setter"

Clubs
 1998/1999 Brazilian Championship -  Champion, with UNIBAN/São Bernardo
 2001 South American Clubs Championship -  Champion, with MRV/Minas
 2001/2002 Brazilian Championship -  Champion, with MRV/Minas
 2005 Italian Championship -  Champion, with Despar Perugia
 2005 Italian Cup -   Champion, with Despar Colussi Perugia
 2004–05 CEV Cup -  Champion, with Sirio Perugia
 2005–06 CEV Indesit Champions League -  Champion, with Sirio Perugia
 2006 Italian Cup -  Champion, with Despar Perugia
 2007 Italian Championship -  Champion, with Despar Perugia
 2007 Italian Cup -   Champion, with Despar Colussi Perugia
 2006–07 CEV Cup -   Champion, with Sirio Perugia
 2007 Spanish Super Cup -   Champion, with Grupo 2002 Murcia
 2007–08 Spanish Queen's Cup -   Champion, with Grupo 2002 Murcia
 2007–08 Spanish Championship -   Champion, with Grupo 2002 Murcia
 2010 Turkish Super Cup -   Champion, with Fenerbahçe Acıbadem
 2010 FIVB World Club Championship -  Champion, with Fenerbahçe Acıbadem
 2010–11 CEV Champions League -  Bronze medal, with Fenerbahçe Acıbadem
 2010–11 Aroma Women's Volleyball League -  Champion, with Fenerbahçe Acıbadem
 2013 Club World Championship -  Runner-up, with Unilever Vôlei
 2013/2014 Superliga -  Champion, with Unilever Vôlei
 2015 South American Clubs Championship -  Champion, with Unilever Vôlei
 2014/2015 Superliga -  Champion, with Unilever Vôlei

References

External links
 Helia Rogerio De Souza Pinto (Fofão) at the International Volleyball Federation
  
  
 
 
 

1970 births
Living people
Brazilian women's volleyball players
Fenerbahçe volleyballers
Volleyball players at the 1992 Summer Olympics
Volleyball players at the 1996 Summer Olympics
Volleyball players at the 2000 Summer Olympics
Volleyball players at the 2004 Summer Olympics
Volleyball players at the 2008 Summer Olympics
Volleyball players at the 1999 Pan American Games
Volleyball players at the 2007 Pan American Games
Olympic volleyball players of Brazil
Olympic gold medalists for Brazil
Olympic bronze medalists for Brazil
Sportspeople from São Paulo
Olympic medalists in volleyball
Medalists at the 2008 Summer Olympics
Medalists at the 2000 Summer Olympics
Medalists at the 1996 Summer Olympics
Pan American Games gold medalists for Brazil
Pan American Games silver medalists for Brazil
Brazilian expatriate sportspeople in Turkey
Brazilian expatriate sportspeople in Spain
Expatriate volleyball players in Spain
Pan American Games medalists in volleyball
Setters (volleyball)
Expatriate volleyball players in Italy
Expatriate volleyball players in Turkey
Brazilian expatriates in Italy
Medalists at the 1991 Pan American Games
Medalists at the 1999 Pan American Games
Medalists at the 2007 Pan American Games